Leptodeira rhombifera is a species of snake in the family Colubridae.  The species is native to Panama, Guatemala, Honduras, El Salvador, Nicaragua, and Costa Rica.

References

Leptodeira
Snakes of Central America
Reptiles of Panama
Reptiles of Guatemala
Reptiles of Honduras
Reptiles of El Salvador
Reptiles of Nicaragua
Reptiles of Costa Rica
Reptiles described in 1872
Taxa named by Albert Günther